Leptospermum glabrescens, commonly known as the smooth teatree, is a shrub or small tree that is endemic to East Gippsland in Victoria, Australia. It has linear, elliptic or narrow egg-shaped leaves, white flowers arranged singly on short side shoots and fruit that remain on the plant.

Description
It has smooth bark on the smaller stems, that is shed in stringy strips. There are broad, brownish bracts at the base of the flower bud but that usually fall off as the flower develops.

Taxonomy and naming
Leptospermum glabrescens was first formally described in 1955 by Norman Arthur Wakefield in The Victorian Naturalist, although the original description included specimens now recognised as L. lanigerum. The specific epithet (glabrescens) is a Latin word meaning "almost glabrous" or "becoming glabrous with age".

Distribution and habitat
Smooth teatree grows in swampy areas and on the edge of watercourses in east Gippsland, from near Cape Conran to near Mallacoota, with a disjunct population near Buchan.

References

glabrescens
Flora of Victoria (Australia)
Plants described in 1955